Mandakranta Sen (born 1972) is an Indian poet of Bengali language. She became the youngest ever winner of Ananda Puraskar in 1999 for her very first poetry book. In 2004, she was awarded Sahitya Akademi Golden Jubilee Award for poetry. She is also a lyricist, composer, fiction writer, dramatist and cover designer. She quit medical studies to become a full-time writer.

Early life and education
Mandakranta was born in Tollygunge, Kolkata on 15 September 1972. She completed her secondary education from Sakhawat Memorial Govt. Girls' High School and higher secondary from Lady Brabourne College. She later went on to study MBBS at Nil Ratan Sircar Medical College and Hospital from 1991-1997, but dropped out just before appearing at her final examinations. Thereafter she devoted herself fulltime to literature.

Literary works
Mandakranta is a major voice in 21st century Bengali poetry. She has achieved success in different literary genres like poetry, novel, short story and essays, although she enjoys reputation chiefly as a poet. She is among foremost Bengali writers writing on conjugal and sexual issues of women. Her poetry is regarded as feminist. Her works have been translated into English and Hindi. She has also translated poetry from English and Hindi. She has also worked as a lyricist, composer, cover designer and a magazine editor.

Awards and recognition
Mandakranta has been awarded Sahitya Akademi Golden Jubilee Award for young writer for her contributions to Bengali poetry. She has also won numerous other awards including Ananda Puraskar (1999), Krittibas Puraskar and Akash Bangla Barsha Samman etc. She is one of the contributors to Sahitya Akademi journals. She was the youngest ever winner of Ananda Puraskar at the age of 27. She has also given poetry readings in Germany.

Controversies
In 2015 Mandakranta returned her Sahitya Akademi Award in protest against the Dadri incident and the mob attacks on writers and rationalists. In 2017 she was threatened with gang rape for standing by fellow writers who protested against Hindutva terror.

Bibliography

Books in English

Books in Bengali

Chapters in books

Journal articles

Translated works
 Andhi Chhalaang (2006) in Hindi

See also
 Indian Poets
 Sahitya Akademi Award
 Bengali Literature
 Tapan Kumar Pradhan
 Ranjit Hoskote

References

External links 
 Mandakranka Sen on Goodreads

Bengali female poets
Women writers from West Bengal
1972 births
Living people
People from Kolkata
People from West Bengal
Bengali writers
Bengali-language writers
Feminist writers
Lady Brabourne College alumni
Recipients of the Sahitya Akademi Golden Jubilee Award
Writers from Kolkata